Professor Carol L. Prives FRS is the Da Costa Professor of Biological Sciences at Columbia University.
She is known for her work in the characterisation of p53, an important tumor suppressor protein frequently mutated in cancer.

Education 
Prives was educated in Canada, received her BSc and PhD in 1966 from McGill University, undertaking research in the lab of Juda Hirsch Quastel. She pursued postdoctoral fellowships at Albert Einstein College of Medicine and the Weizmann Institute under the mentorship of Professor Michel Revel. after which she became a faculty member at the Weizmann Institute. She received an honorary Doctor of Sciences degree from McGill University, her alma mater, on 29 May 2014 for her contributions to the understanding of p53.

Research and career 
In 1995, she was appointed as the Da Costa Professor of Biology at Columbia University. She was the chair of the Department of Biological Sciences from 2000 to 2004.

Her early interest in the SV40 DNA tumour virus as a model for eukaryotic gene expression and oncogenic transformation led her to the study of p53. Since the late 1980s, her lab has focused on the p53 tumour suppressor gene, one of the most frequently mutated in human cancers.

Prives has served as chair of the Experimental Virology and the Cell and Molecular Pathology study sections of the National Institutes of Health. She has been a member of the Scientific Advisory Boards of the Dana–Farber Cancer Institute, the Memorial Sloan Kettering Cancer Center, the Massachusetts General Cancer Center, the National Cancer Institute, and the Weizmann Institute. She was a member of the board of directors of the American Association for Cancer Research from 2004 to 2007. She also served on the Life Sciences jury for the Infosys Prize in 2010.

She is a member of the editorial boards of Cell, Oncogene and the Proceedings of the National Academy of Sciences.

Awards 
 1996 NIH MERIT Award
 2000 Elected Fellow, American Academy of Arts and Sciences
 2001 Elected Fellow, American Academy of Microbiology
 2005 Elected Member, Institute of Medicine
 2008 Elected Member, National Academy of Sciences
 2009 Rosalind E. Franklin Award for Women in Science, National Cancer Institute
 2010 Paul Janssen Prize in Biotechnology and Medicine, Center for Advanced Biotechnology and Medicine
 2011 AACR-Women in Cancer Research Charlotte Friend Memorial Lectureship
 2015 Elected Fellow, AACR Academy
 2020 Elected Fellow, The Royal Society
 2021 Recipient of AACR-G.H.A. Clowes Award for Outstanding Basic Cancer Research

References 

Year of birth missing (living people)
Living people
Fellows of the AACR Academy
Columbia University faculty
McGill University alumni
Canadian women biologists
20th-century Canadian biologists
21st-century Canadian biologists
Albert Einstein College of Medicine alumni
20th-century American biologists
21st-century American women scientists
20th-century American women scientists
21st-century American biologists
Scientists from New York City
Female Fellows of the Royal Society
American women academics
20th-century Canadian women scientists
21st-century Canadian women scientists
Canadian Fellows of the Royal Society
Members of the National Academy of Medicine